A transmit and receive integrated assembly (TRIA) is used on a two-way satellite dish to process signals to and from a ground-based system and an earth-orbiting satellite. The TRIA is the part of the antenna which contains both the feed horn and the circuits which convert high-frequency satellite signals such as X-band, Ku-band and Ka-band to and from the L-band microwave signals used for transmission between the dish and the customer-premises equipment.

See also
LNBF
Block upconverter

Satellite broadcasting
Antennas